Desirae Krawczyk and Joe Salisbury defeated Elena Vesnina and Aslan Karatsev in the final, 2–6, 6–4, [10–5] to win the mixed doubles title at the 2021 French Open. It was Krawczyk's first major title, and was Salisbury's first major title in mixed doubles. Additionally, this was Vesnina's first major final since returning from pregnancy, and Karatsev's first major final in any discipline. Vesnina and Karatsev were the first Russian team to reach the French Open mixed doubles final.

Latisha Chan and Ivan Dodig were the two-time defending champions, but lost in the first round to Demi Schuurs and Wesley Koolhof.

This was the first edition of this event since 2019, as the 2020 edition was cancelled due to the COVID-19 pandemic. The tournament featured only 16 teams, instead of the usual 32 teams.

Seeds

Draw

Draw

Other entry information

Wild cards

Protected ranking

Alternate pair

Withdrawals
Before the tournament
  Gabriela Dabrowski /  Mate Pavić → replaced by  Gabriela Dabrowski /  Luke Saville
  CoCo Vandeweghe /  Jürgen Melzer → replaced by  Laura Siegemund /  Sander Gillé

References
Main Draw

External links

Mixed Doubles
French Open – Mixed doubles
French Open – Mixed doubles
French Open by year – Mixed doubles